Louis Augustus Phillips (24 February 1878 – 14 March 1916) was a Welsh rugby player, who played half-back for Newport RFC, and won four caps for . He was also a talented amateur golfer.

Born in Newport, Monmouthshire, Phillips was educated at Monmouth Grammar School, leaving to become an architect. He played rugby at school and then at Newport, earning a place in the 1st XV after several players retired or defected to rugby league. He made 90 appearances for Newport, during which he developed a famous half-back partnership with Llewellyn Lloyd. His debut for Wales, playing alongside Lloyd, was against  in 1900, when Wales won the Triple Crown. He earned selection again in 1901 but was forced to retire from rugby after incurring an injury playing .

Phillips enlisted in the 20th (Service) Battalion Royal Fusiliers at the start of the First World War. He was deployed to the Western Front in November 1915. He was shot dead while out on a wiring party on the night of 14 March 1916, near Cambrin, France.

Early life
Louis Augustus Phillips was born at Stow Hill, Newport, Monmouthshire on 24 February 1878. He was educated at Monmouth Grammar School. After serving his articles with Huberston and Fawkner, architects, he began practising in 1907.

Rugby career
Phillips began playing rugby while at Monmouth Grammar School. He went on to play for Newport RFC, earning selection for the first team in 1897. His first season at Newport was disappointing for the club, which lost seven games, after the previous six consecutive years of success. Several players had moved to Yorkshire to play rugby league, while others had married and retired. Nevertheless, Phillips was one of four new players in the team to 'make an impact', alongside George Boots, Jehoida Hodges and Reg Skrimshire.

Half-back partnership with Llewellyn Lloyd
The 1897–8 season at Newport saw the beginning of a 'historic' partnership at half-back between Phillips and Llewellyn Lloyd that lasted till 1901. Phillips and Lloyd were thought of as a pair, both playing along similar lines and sharing the work of scrum-half and outside-half. While Lloyd was a smarter runner, Phillips was a better kick, but both of them could drop goals, and were remarkable in their kicks to touch.

In the 1898–9 season, Newport suffered from further retirements: Boots and Phillips were the only 2 players to appear in all 24 matches of the season. During the following season, 1899–1900, with Lloyd as captain, the club was reinvigorated and scored 416 points compared with 192 in the previous season. Phillips and Lloyd were adjudged to be the half-back pair of the season at both club and international level, even if there were some more brilliant individuals. In total, Phillips appeared 90 times for Newport, scoring 9 tries, 2 drop goals and 1 penalty. Townsend Collins remarked: 'He had no tricks or subtleties, but he played the orthodox game of the day with supreme success.'

Wales
Phillips, who was a strong runner and tackled well, made his international debut for Wales against  on 6 January 1900 at Gloucester. His initial selection was principally due to his partnership at Newport with Lloyd, who also made selection for Wales. Lloyd had already played in 1896 against Ireland, and against Scotland and Ireland in 1899. During the game, which Wales won 3–13, Phillips displayed 'special smartness' and used 'the acme of judgment' in his first international appearance, proving also to be a 'splendid defender'. He was reckoned to be amongst the best of the backs, and the combination with Lloyd was excellent. In the following match, against  at Swansea on 27 January, the half-back partnership of Phillips and Lloyd continued to perform: their defensive play was 'sound', and in attack, Phillips' 'splendid' fielding and kicking to touch, matched Lloyd's 'cleverness' and 'dodging ability'. Wales was again victorious, 12–3. The half-back combination was not as good as with Lloyd but worked better than pundits had expected. The 0–3 victory over the Irish earned the Welsh the Triple Crown.

Phillips missed the opening match of the 1901 international season against England due to an injury to his knee: he was replaced at the last moment by Bala Jones of Aberavon RFC. Thinking that he had recovered, Phillips was back for the following match, against Scotland on 9 February at Inverleith, but within ten minutes he was almost helpless. He played on, and 'his last match was a tragic end to a great if short career.' The Scottish half-backs, Jimmy Gillespie and Frank Fasson, outplayed Lloyd and Phillips, and prevented the Welsh backline from receiving much ball. Scotland beat Wales 18–8, and the Welsh defeat was blamed on the half-backs.

International appearances

Golf
In 1907 and again in 1912, Phillips was Welsh Amateur golf champion. He was also runner-up for the Irish Amateur Open Championship in 1913, and in the following year, 1914, he was beaten in the sixth round of The Amateur Championship. Phillips also represented the Wales golf team, facing Ireland in August 1913.

Military service and death

At the start of the First World War, Phillips enlisted in the 20th (Service) Battalion Royal Fusiliers, and after refusing a commission, served as a Sergeant. The 20th Royal Fusiliers was one of four battalions of the regiment raised in 1914 by the Public Schools and University Men’s Force. Phillips was deployed to France with his unit on 16 November 1915. On the night of 14 March 1916, while out on a wiring party, he was shot through the chest and killed, near Cambrin, France.

He is buried in Cambrin Churchyard Extension (Grave L1 10B).

See also
 List of international rugby union players killed in action during the First World War

References

Bibliography

Further reading

 
 

1878 births
1916 deaths
Burials in France
Military personnel from Monmouthshire
British Army personnel of World War I
British military personnel killed in World War I
Rugby union scrum-halves
Welsh rugby union players
Wales international rugby union players
Newport RFC players
People educated at Monmouth School for Boys
Rugby union players from Newport, Wales
Welsh male golfers
Amateur golfers
Royal Fusiliers soldiers